Hossa may refer to:

People 
 František Hossa (born 1954), Slovak ice hockey player
 Marián Hossa (born 1979), Slovak ice hockey player
 Marcel Hossa (born 1981), Slovak ice hockey player

Places 
 Hossa (Finland), a village in the Suomussalmi municipality, Oulu province, Finland

See also 
 Gossa (disambiguation)